An earthquake struck approximately 53 kilometres SSE of the town of Mansfield (in the vicinity of the township of Woods Point), in the Victorian Alps of Australia on 22 September 2021, at 09:15 local time. The earthquake measured 5.9 on the moment magnitude scale. The earthquake caused minor structural damage in parts of Melbourne and left one person injured. The earthquake was also felt in New South Wales, Australian Capital Territory, South Australia and Tasmania. The earthquake was substantially stronger than the 1989 Newcastle earthquake that measured 5.6 and killed 13 people.

Tectonic setting
The Australian landmass is situated in the Australian Plate, far from any known active plate boundary, where most of the world's earthquakes occur. Such earthquakes at the plate boundary are known as interplate earthquakes. In Australia, earthquakes occurring within the Australian Plate are known as intraplate earthquakes because they happen within a tectonic plate rather than at the boundary.

The earthquake is situated in the Lachlan Fold Belt, an orogenic belt consisting of folded and faulted strata. This zone formed as a result of plate convergence occurring at the eastern boundary of the supercontinent Gondwana during the Neoproterozoic. From the Neoproterozoic to Early Devonian, the region was dominated by thrusting and some rifting. Crustal deformation were later accommodated by predominantly strike-slip faulting in the Devonian. One of the major strike-slip faults accommodating this deformation is the Baragwanath Transform; a transform fault. Rifting also occurred in this period, leading to volcanism. By the Middle Devonian, the Baragwanath Transform became extinct. The Governor Fault marks the northern margin of the Mebourne Zone, and southern margin of the Tabberabberan Orogeny, and is characterised by strike-slip movement.

The Governor Fault is a large intraplate fault that runs from mid-western New South Wales, along part of the Murray River bed and cutting through Central North Victoria near Barmah to the Victorian Alps near Mount Buller (near the quake epicentre) down toward the Gippsland Basin near the coast at Saint Margaret Island. Tectonically this fault separates the Melbourne and Tabberabberan structural zones.

An earthquake of magnitude 6.0 or larger strikes Australia about once every six to ten years, based on the seismological data collected over the past 150 years. The last known magnitude 6.0 quake in Australia occurred in 2016 in the Northern Territory. That earthquake occurred as a result of shallow reverse faulting within the Australian Plate. The largest earthquake in Australia was the mainshock of the 1988 Tennant Creek earthquakes which consisted of an 6.7 quake preceded by two > 6.0 foreshocks.

Earthquake
According to the U.S. Geological Survey, the earthquake was the result of strike-slip faulting at a shallow depth of 10 km, while Geoscience Australia placed the depth at 12 km. The European-Mediterranean Seismological Centre reported the focal depth at 2 km. A preliminary insight of the quake of such magnitude suggest a rupture along a fault measuring 5 km long and 3 km wide. The geological fault involved has been identified as the western reaches of Governor Fault. Seismologists at the University of Melbourne said the earthquake likely ruptured along an east-west striking strike-slip fault. The earthquake occurred when elastic strain accumulated on active fault is released in the form of seismic waves that are felt on the surface as shaking.

On the modified Mercalli intensity scale, the earthquake earned a maximum intensity of VII (Very strong). Tremors were felt in Adelaide, southern New South Wales, Canberra, and as far as Launceston, Tasmania.

Impact
According to a geologist at the University of Melbourne, the quake produced ten seconds of strong shaking which was felt by people. The earthquake generated shaking lasting up to a minute at the epicenter region.

Many residential buildings in Melbourne were evacuated due to the damage inflicted by the quake. Some damage was reported in many parts of Victoria. On Chapel Street, the earthquake collapsed the top facade of Betty's Burgers & Concrete Co., which is a brick building and left debris across the road. Along Brunswick Road in Fitzroy another brick building suffered a partial collapse of its facade. At least 46 instances of building damage to chimneys and facades were reported in the city. Tall residential apartments of up to 50 storeys swayed for as much as 20 seconds, triggering panic among residents. In Mansfield near the epicentre, there was minor damage to some buildings including a local ambulance centre. Power outages were reported across parts of metropolitan Melbourne.

In the town of Mansfield, Victoria, the quake caused some minor damage to buildings, resulting in no casualties. At least 40 km away is a gold mine operated by Kaiser Reef. When the tremors began, at least 12 mining workers were present in the mine and were brought to the surface unhurt. Kaiser Reef said that mining would cease temporarily while inspections were carried out. The company did not find any damage in the mine area. Another mine located 60 km away, and operated by White Rock Minerals did not find any damage to their mines after the quake. Nine workers under the mine were safely evacuated.

Initially, state officials and emergency services said no casualties were caused by the earthquake, but a man in Mount Eliza, a coastal suburb in Melbourne, sustained minor injuries. The man was injured when construction fell on him while he was working.

Geoscience Australia said the earthquake is the strongest to hit Victoria in 50 years. It is also the largest earthquake on land in the nation since a magnitude 6.0 struck the Northern Territory in 2016.

Response
Acting Premier of Victoria James Merlino announced a statewide Watch and Act warning was in place for Victoria. The Fire & Rescue New South Wales service stated on social media that they had received calls for assistance in the New South Wales area, but did not report any serious structural damage.

Media coverage
The earthquake made headlines in Australian news outlets the moment it occurred. News Breakfast was interrupted by the shaking which was video recorded. The earthquake which lasted 20 seconds in the filming studio caught hosts Michael Rowland and Tony Armstrong by surprise.

Further tremors
On 4 October 2021, a 2.9-magnitude tremor was felt in the Victorian town of Rawson at approximately 11:11 pm. The following day, two further tremors were recorded, both with a 3.0 magnitude occurring at 7:17 am and at 9:17 am. It is believed to be linked to the earthquake which occurred two weeks prior. Geoscience Australia estimates that the depth of those tremors was 8 to 10 kilometres deep.

See also

List of earthquakes in 2021
List of earthquakes in Australia

References

Further reading

Mansfield
2020s in Victoria (Australia)
Earthquakes in Australia
History of Victoria (Australia)
September 2021 events in Australia